The Power and the Prize is a 1956 drama film directed by Henry Koster, written by Robert Ardrey, starring Robert Taylor and Burl Ives. It was nominated for an Academy Award in 1957 for costume design.

Plot
Although he is scheduled to wed his boss George Salt's niece that weekend, Amalgamated World Metals vice chairman Cliff Barton is sent to London to conduct a business deal that will enrich the firm. Salt considers him a protege and intends to turn over control of the company to Barton someday, insisting to him that business always comes first.

Cliff must hide the fact from Mr. Carew, who runs the British company, that Salt intends to unscrupulously assume control of the company rather than simply merge with it. While following through on Mrs. Salt's request to drop by her pet London-based charity, Cliff learns that it is operated by an Austrian refugee, and former Nazi concentration camp prisoner, named Miriam Linka.

Although his loyalties are with the company, Cliff wants no part of betraying Carew's trust. He also, against all odds, falls in love with Miriam and persuades her to return to America with him to be married. Salt angrily tries to spin the guilt so that it appears Cliff was the one defrauding the British, while accusations fly that Miriam is not only a prostitute but a Communist as well. Cliff is prepared to resign his position rather than give up Miriam, but board member Guy Elliot has investigated Miriam and clears the rumors about her with an Army Intelligence report. Elliot then presses Salt to retire, making Barton chairman as was always planned. Barton is made chairman and leaves on a honeymoon with Miriam.

Cast
 Robert Taylor as Cliff Barton
 Burl Ives as George Salt
 Mary Astor as Mrs. Salt
 Cedric Hardwicke as Carew
 Charles Coburn as Guy Elliot
 Elisabeth Muller as Miriam

Reception
According to MGM records the film earned only $570,000 in the US and Canada and $500,000 elsewhere resulting in a loss of $883,000.

See also
List of American films of 1956

References

External links

1956 films
CinemaScope films
Films directed by Henry Koster
Films with screenplays by Robert Ardrey
1956 drama films
Metro-Goldwyn-Mayer films
Films scored by Bronisław Kaper
1957 drama films
1957 films
American black-and-white films
Films set in London
1950s English-language films
American drama films